David Fischer (born February 19, 1988) is an American former professional ice hockey defenseman who is currently an assistant coach with EC KAC's affiliate club, KAC Future Team of the Alps Hockey League (AlpsHL). He was drafted by the Montreal Canadiens in the first round, 20th overall, in the 2006 NHL Entry Draft.

Playing career

Amateur
Fischer was born in Minneapolis, Minnesota and played for Apple Valley High School in the Minnesota State High School League. In 2006 - 2007, he played his first season as a freshman for the University of Minnesota in the WCHA. In 42 games, he recorded five assists.

Professional
Fischer attended training camp with the Vancouver Canucks in 2010, but was released. He signed with the Florida Everblades of the ECHL just over a week later. He played with Florida in both the 2010-11 and 2011-12 seasons, going to the playoffs both years, and winning the Kelly Cup in 2012.

On July 17, 2012, it was announced that Fischer had signed a contract to play with the Heilbronner Falken of the 2nd Bundesliga in Germany.

After a successful season with Heilbronner, Fischer moved up to the top German league the following 2013–14 season, signing a one-year contract for Krefeld Pinguine in the DEL on July 24, 2013. He eventually remained in Krefeld until the end of the 2015-16 campaign.

Fischer penned a deal with EC KAC of the Austrian Hockey League (EBEL) in April 2016.

Fischer missed the entirety of his fifth season with EC KAC in 2020–21 due to injury and after having the intention to resume his career in the 2021–22 season, he was announced to have suffered a setback on August 3, 2021. With a long term recovery looming, Fischer opted to end his 10 year professional playing career, and accept an assistant coaching role to continue within the EC KAC organization on August 16, 2021.

Career statistics

Awards
 Minnesota Mr. Hockey (best senior high school player in Minnesota): 2005–06 season.

References

External links

1988 births
American men's ice hockey defensemen
Florida Everblades players
Houston Aeros (1994–2013) players
Ice hockey people from Minneapolis
EC KAC players
Krefeld Pinguine players
Living people
Minnesota Golden Gophers men's ice hockey players
Montreal Canadiens draft picks
National Hockey League first-round draft picks
Apple Valley High School (Minnesota) alumni